Goto Predestinatsia (God's Predestination, literally The Providence of God) was a Russian 18th century navy flagship, 58-gun three-masted ship of the line.

She was commissioned on April 27, 1700 at the Voronezh Admiralty wharf, and was in service until 1711 as a part of the Azov flotilla. After the unsuccessful Prut campaign and the loss of Azov the Goto Predestinatsia was sold to the Ottoman Empire.

She was the first Russian ship of the line and the first ship of this rate built in Russia without any help from foreign experts.

Replica

Sources

Goto Predestinatsia

Ships of the Imperial Russian Navy
Ships of the line of the Imperial Russian Navy